Isis is a superheroine appearing in American comic books published by DC Comics, as well as a separate Egyptian goddess also living in the DC Universe. The superhero character is modeled closely after the main character of The Secrets of Isis, a live-action television program starring Joanna Cameron that served as the second half of The Shazam!/Isis Hour. The television character, named Andrea Thomas, appeared in several late 1970s DC Comics publications.

A subsequent incarnation of the character named Adrianna Tomaz was introduced into the DC Universe in 2006 as a female counterpart to the character Black Adam, a part of the Shazam! family of characters. The Egyptian goddess character has been depicted within the comic book Wonder Woman.

The television series Smallville depicted Isis as a supervillain form taken on by Lois Lane (played by Erica Durance) when possessed by the Amulet of Isis, while Adrianna Tomaz appeared later in the episode, played by Erica Cerra. The Arrowverse television series Legends of Tomorrow introduced a new incarnation of the character, named Zari Tomaz, played by Tala Ashe. This version was portrayed as a wise-cracking hacker from the future with wind powers derived from an amulet and no superhero code name. After the fourth season, another version of Zari Tarazi was introduced as a social media influencer with the same actress portraying her. The Adrianna Tomaz version of the character appeared in the DC Extended Universe film Black Adam (2022), played by Sarah Shahi.

Fictional character biography

Andrea Thomas and Saturday morning television series

Like the main character of the first half of the program, Captain Marvel, Isis 
had roots in ancient Egyptian mythology. The television series The Secrets of Isis starred Joanna Cameron as Andrea Thomas, a high school science teacher who gains the ability to call upon the powers of the goddess Isis after finding an Egyptian amulet during an archeological dig in Egypt, as revealed during the show's opening title sequence. Fifteen episodes of The Secrets of Isis were produced for The Shazam! Isis Hour, and the character also appeared in three episodes of the Shazam! portion of the show. The Secrets of Isis was given its own timeslot in 1977, for which seven new episodes were broadcast alongside reruns from the first two seasons.

Isis later appeared in animated form on Filmation's Tarzan and the Super 7 show in 1980, as part of a segment called The Freedom Force. She later guest starred on The Kid Super Power Hour with Shazam!s "Hero High" segment, though Cameron did not voice the character.

Powers and abilities
Isis demonstrated numerous powers that manifested when the need arose. These included flight, super speed, super strength (to a level comparable to Superman and Wonder Woman), telekinesis (the ability to move and levitate objects), geokinesis (the ability to control elements such as fire, earth, wind, and water), the ability to change the molecules of inanimate objects to allow people to pass through them, the ability to act as a human lightning rod, remote viewing, and (at her power's maximum) the ability to stop and reverse time. To activate these powers, Isis usually is shown reciting a rhyming chant (the most frequent being "Oh zephyr winds that blow on high, lift me now so I can fly!"). The medallion Andrea Thomas uses to change into Isis also gives her apparent limited powers even when in her non-Isis form, as she is shown communicating telepathically with her pet crow Tut and engaging in minor mind control even without changing. She also received superior hand-to-hand and weapons combat skills from the goddess.

Love interests
Andrea/Isis' love interest is fellow teacher Rick Mason (although this relationship is more implied than explicitly stated, the two characters are simply shown in many episodes enjoying each other's company: going on picnics, horseback riding, and going for dinner together). As in the classic Lois Lane example, Mason remains oblivious to the physical similarities between Andrea and Isis, beyond some idle speculation in early episodes. In one episode ("The Seeing Eye Horse") a blind character realizes that Isis and Andrea have almost identical voices, but otherwise the series never explored the secret identity dilemma in any serious way. During the abbreviated second season, cosmetic changes were made to the Isis character in terms of makeup and hairstyle.

First appearance in comics
Isis' first appearance in comics was in Shazam! #25 (September – October 1976). She was later given her own TV tie-in book the following month, titled The Mighty Isis, which ran for two years, out-surviving the TV series. The eight-issue run by DC Comics began in October 1976 and ended in January 1978; early issues featured a special "DC TV" logo. All stories starred the Andrea Thomas character from the television series; the book was edited by Denny O'Neil, written by Jack C. Harris and most issues illustrated by Mike Vosburg (the first issue was illustrated by Ric Estrada and Wallace Wood). Although early issues stayed within the format of the TV series, later issues covered storylines beyond the scope of the show, such as a story arc involving Andrea abandoning her "human" alter ego and cutting ties with her friends and family, resulting in Rick Mason revealing his love for her. Like other DC characters who have been reimagined, this version of Isis, though not mentioned or appearing in Crisis on Infinite Earths, can be assumed to have been retconned out of existence following the 1985 DC miniseries.

As a goddess within the DC Universe
In January 2002, DC Comics re-introduced the goddess Isis as one of the chief gods worshipped by the Bana-Mighdallian Amazons in the Wonder Woman comic. Although the Bana tribe was introduced in 1989, their gods were not shown until 2002. Her introduction depicted her in a standard white sleeveless gown and Egyptian headdress containing her trademark symbol. Later, the various Amazon gods were depicted as selecting more modern appearances for themselves. After this, Isis was then shown as wearing a black business suit with skirt, long straight black hair, and a neck choker containing an ankh.

Adrianna Tomaz

52

The superhero Isis was re-introduced in the DC Universe in the weekly comic book 52, in issue #3 (May 2006). In this series, an Egyptian woman named Adrianna Tomaz (an homage to the Andrea Thomas character on the television program) is a refugee who is enslaved and brought to Black Adam as a gift from Intergang along with $2,000,000 in gold. Upon freeing her and killing the emissaries who had brought her to him, Black Adam found her to be unafraid and highly vocal about how he could change his country for the better.

After weeks of discussion during which Adrianna changed the way Adam looked at the world and inspired him to commit kinder acts, Adam retrieved the magical amulet of Isis from the tomb of his wife and children, and asked Captain Marvel, now the Keeper of the Rock of Eternity, to confer its power on Adrianna. The Amulet of Isis had long ago belonged to another of the wizard Shazam's champions, Queen Pharaoh Hatshepsut of the 18th Dynasty, who had used it to bring peace to her kingdom. Upon Hatshepsut's death the amulet became dormant.

Upon holding the amulet and speaking "I am Isis," Adrianna was transformed and instilled with the powers of the goddess. She and Adam then began traveling the Middle East and freeing enslaved children, hoping to find Adrianna's kidnapped brother. In Week 16 of the series, Adam proposes marriage to Isis, offering a jewel given to Cleopatra by Caesar; they are wed by Captain Marvel, who invokes the gods of all the universes and planets. Intergang unsuccessfully attempts to ruin the wedding with a suicide bomber. Several other Shazam! characters attend the ceremony, and Mary Marvel, Captain Marvel, Jr., Tawky Tawny and Uncle Dudley serve as members of the wedding party. Isis is a calming influence on Black Adam, transforming him from a ruthless dictator into a more benevolent figure.

This incarnation of Isis has powers similar to Black Adam's. She can also heal wounds of nearly any severity. She has control over nature, related to her mood: rain falls when she's sad even if she is inside, flowers bloom when she is happy. Her first transformation is triggered by the phrase "I am Isis", but later transformations use the phrase, "Oh Mighty Isis" instead.

Adrianna finally locates her brother Amon, who has been tortured and crippled by Whisper A'Daire for his refusal to join Intergang's religion of crime and for his multiple escape attempts. Isis stops Black Adam from taking revenge on the Intergang members. Isis is unable to fully heal Amon's wounds because they are too deep and complex. Black Adam asks Amon to say his name; upon doing so, Amon is struck by Shazam's mystic lightning bolt and transformed into Osiris. Reunited with her brother, Isis decides to change the world beginning with China. Osiris convinces her to also change the public perception of the Black Marvel Family. Isis coaxes Black Adam into joining them in a public unmasking of their secret identities and a public declaration of their good intentions for the future. The Black Marvels defeat the demon Sabbac at Halloween when he tries to sacrifice children to Neron, further increasing their popularity. During a charity dinner with Mrs. Sivana, Osiris befriends a humanoid crocodile, Sobek, that escaped from Sivana's lab.

Amanda Waller is not convinced of the Black Marvels' good intentions, and she forms a new Suicide Squad. She sends the Persuader to attack Isis with his radioactive ax. Osiris rushes to help her and he cuts the Persuader in half. Osiris is distraught over the unintentional death, and Isis whisks him away from the scene. Photographic evidence of the incident turns public opinion against the Black Marvel Family. Osiris believes that his powers make him evil, and he blames Black Adam. A series of calculated events arranged by Intergang lead to Osiris' death at the hands of Sobek. The Black Marvels battle with the Four Horsemen of the Apocalypse, manifested in physical forms controlled by Intergang and Doctor Sivana.

Isis dies when she is infected with diseases from the Horseman, Pestilence, while she defends Adam against the Horseman, Death. Before she dies, Isis tells Adam that she was wrong in trying to change him, and she begs him to avenge her and Osiris' deaths. Adam's path of vengeance instigates World War III. Several weeks later, an unidentified individual takes Isis' amulet; Adrianna appears to be trapped inside it.

One Year Later
In Black Adam: The Dark Age, Adam (now under his civilian title of "Teth-Adam") gets into Khandaq under a false name, and takes her remains despite a shootout in which nearly all his men are killed. In the mountains, he is forced to eat his servant Hassan who offers himself to Black Adam. He fails to notice that he has dropped one of her fingers and her ring at the tomb. He resurrects Isis using the Lazarus Pit. Her resurrection is short lived, as Adam is forced to kill Isis again upon seeing her new body rotting away as soon as she has come back to life. Her bones are then transferred to Doctor Fate's tower, where, with the assistance of Felix Faust, Adam turns them into a magical conduit to imbue himself with god-like powers taken from Isis' corpse itself. Apparently, Isis still could be revived, but every time Adam takes power from her, her bones become more brittle, jeopardizing a new attempt at resurrection. Faust reveals that it is Isis' amulet that can revive her, and that Mary Marvel and Captain Marvel Jr. broke it into four parts and scattered it across the globe. It is later revealed that the missing fragments of her body, the reason the Lazarus Pit failed, were being held by Atom-Smasher who found it when the Justice Society investigated the tomb. He meets Black Adam and gives them to him.

Finally, Black Adam manages to find the pieces of the amulet and reunites it with the now-complete skeleton. The spell apparently backfires, resulting in a shambling, rotting corpse. A séance takes place in which Isis' spirit swears eternal hate for her husband, before returning to death. Black Adam flees, laden with guilt, emptiness, and rage; then Faust begins the real rite, having shown Black Adam the skeleton of Ralph Dibny as a way to hide the real Isis from him and blame "her" rotten condition on Black Adam's abuse of their now-shared powers. So Isis is able to be fully restored to life, even if bound by powerful spells to drain her will and bind her to mindless obedience. Now a mere puppet in Faust's hands, Isis' magic is used to free him from his imprisonment in Fate's tower by creating a magical doorway through the tower wall. Felix Faust then drags her away to a hideout, where it is strongly implied that he sexually assaults the paralyzed Isis.

Later, Black Adam, still mourning for her, finds a bloodied flower sprouting in their family shrine. He takes it as a sign that Isis is trying to communicate with him, which becomes apparent when he finds a larger collection of flowers in the shape of the Shazam lightning bolt symbol, pointing in the direction Adam must go to find her. Eventually, Black Adam finds Isis and Felix Faust, and Adam forces Faust to release Isis from his control. The resurrected Isis is far less merciful and forgiving than before, and castrates Faust for his treatment of her. Reunited, Isis and Adam travel to the Rock of Eternity, where they banish Captain Marvel back to Earth as a powerless Billy Batson (Isis has turned him back using magic lightning from saying Shazam from a spell book) and begin setting a plan in motion to "cleanse the Earth" of evil their way, even recruiting Mary Marvel to their crusade. The Justice Society come to the Rock of Eternity, seeking to help Billy, only for Isis to brutally attack them, even throwing Jay Garrick into the mists covering the Rock, from which there is no escape. During the course of the fight, the combatants end up in Kahndaq, where the people praise Black Adam's return. Isis then kills several of the followers, claiming that they are tainted by this new Earth. Black Adam attempts to protect his people, only to be attacked by Mary and Billy, who had been tainted by Mary's power. At that point, Jay Garrick appears with the spirit of Billy's father, and Shazam, whom the former had helped Jay recover from the Rock of Finality. Adam is convinced to return his power to Shazam so that the wizard's spirit can save Isis from her corruption. Shazam is released from his stone form. In turn, Shazam takes the power from Isis, Billy, and Mary, and transforms Teth-Adam and Adrianna into statues. Some time later, a shadowy figure appears to the statues in a bolt of lightning, wanting them to be his "champions."

Brightest Day
After the events of the Blackest Night storyline, Osiris is resurrected by the White Lantern Entity and returns to Khandaq, vowing to restore the kingdom to its former prosperity. Osiris takes the petrified bodies of Adam and Isis and flies off to an unknown destination. Despite his best efforts, Osiris is unable to return Adam and Adrianna to their living states. He ultimately aligns himself with Deathstroke and his new team of Titans after being told that the mercenary can help him return his family to life. Both Adrianna and Teth-Adam are currently stored in Deathstroke's base of operations, the Labyrinth.

It is ultimately revealed by the White Lantern Entity that Osiris was resurrected with the express purpose of saving Adrianna from her fate. During a battle with a drug kingpin named Elijah, Osiris experiences a vision of Isis after falling asleep due to the villain Pisces. He is told that he is guilty for his hand in the murder of Ryan Choi, and that in order to free her, he will have to kill more people. Osiris accidentally electrocutes Elijah after waking from his vision after yelling 'Isis,' and returns home to find that more cracks have appeared on Isis' statue. He then surmises that it was Elijah's death which caused the cracks, and states that he will indeed have to kill more people to free Isis from her prison. He then kills a guard at Arkham Asylum using his lightning channelled by saying 'Isis' again, although he seems to not enjoy this action, saying 'Great Ra forgive me.' After killing two bank robbers, Osiris is confronted by Freddy Freeman. Somehow, Osiris manages to steal Freddy's power and give it to Isis. However, Isis' first words upon being reunited with her brother are "What have you done to me?" It is soon revealed that the killings Osiris did in her name have corrupted her soul, causing her to haphazardly shift between her kind, caring personality and a callous, cruel one. When Osiris' back is turned, Isis breaks out of the Labyrinth. She goes on a rampage, unable to stop herself from using nature to try to destroy the world. In desperation, she attempts to commit suicide by lightning, but Osiris shields her with his own body. When they awake, Isis discovers that the corruption has left her, but she still feels it inside Osiris, and it worries her.

It was later revealed by the Entity that Isis was brought back to life because she's the one that will aid the Swamp Thing.

Later, Isis aids her brother Osiris in stopping the Quraci soldiers who are attacking Kahndaq. Isis learns that Osiris has become more violent, killing the soldiers. When the Justice League attacks Deathstroke's Titans, they are stopped by Isis, who forces them to leave Kahndaq at once. She declares her rulership of Kahndaq, and withdraws the country from the United Nations, stating that they will outlaw outsiders and recognize no power but their own, and that any intrusion will incite World War III. The Justice League's only option is to leave, and Deathstroke's Titans leave as well. Isis then tells Osiris that he is not welcome in Kahndaq, because of his bloodlust.

The New 52
In September 2011, The New 52 rebooted DC's continuity. In this new timeline, Adrianna Tomaz is a young woman who, by fighting specifically against Khandaq's evil rule, is opposed to her brother Amon entering The Sons of Adam terrorist group. However, after he is killed by Khandaq's forces and she is forced to resurrect Black Adam, Adrianna decides to follow a path of violence, with an unknown voice saying that she will be chosen to wield power.

Powers and abilities
In order to change form, Adrianna must be able to say "I am Isis", thereby invoking spells involving the energies of the extra-dimensional being once known as Isis on Earth. This spell adds almost a hundred pounds of impervious godly muscle and tissue to her frame. This spell seems to be solely vocal; she cannot access this spell if she is gagged or hampered in some way from talking (the precision of this spell is somewhat erratic). All Adrianna has to say is "I am Isis" and she is mystically transformed and instilled with the powers of the goddess. It was later revealed that the powers that Adrianna draws from Isis are the most powerful of the eight Egyptian Gods. When her powers were possessed by Black Adam, he was able to fight off most of the superheroes on Earth alone. When Black Adam transferred both his and Isis's powers to Mary Marvel, she was able to easily withstand Darkseid's Omega Beams.

After transforming, Adrianna/Isis gains physical abilities similar to her brother, husband, and the other Marvels. She is superhumanly strong and is easily capable of lifting far in excess of 100 tons, putting her on the same level as Supergirl, Power Girl, Mary Marvel, Donna Troy, Big Barda and Wonder Woman. Isis is also incredibly durable and cannot be harmed by physical force unless the being she is engaged with is stronger than her. She is also totally bulletproof and bladed weapons shatter against her skin. She is superhumanly fast, capable of moving at speeds past Mach 10 on Earth. Isis also has far superior reflexes and agility when compared to normal humans or even other superhumans. She is also able to mystically fly through the air at incredible speeds and can travel across and around the planet in minutes. Like the other Marvels, Isis possesses an immense degree of superhuman intelligence, allowing her to come up with solutions to complicated problems quickly. Unlike the other Marvels, Isis's powers focus on the control of nature. She has control over water, fire, earth, air and electricity, and can control the weather and the lava within the Earth. These powers are tied to her emotions. When she cried, it began to rain and when she grew angry, enormous roses crushed the buildings around her. Simply put, Isis is nature and can control its every aspect. In addition to her manipulation of natural materials, Isis possesses the power of telekinesis, allowing her to lift objects, fire blasts of telekinetic force, and to create telekinetic shields. Isis's godly energies are able to heal nearly any wound that has been inflicted upon her with surprising speed (though she has died before). Using a second amulet, Isis is able to achieve clairvoyance and is able to see events happening in the present at remote locations. However, she cannot use this power to see into the past or the future. Due to her death and subsequent resurrection, Isis had a bit of trouble controlling her powers for a time. She stated that this was because Nature had deemed her a failed subject, but she has since regained full control.

Other versions
In the alternate timeline of the Flashpoint event, Isis is mentioned by her brother, Osiris, believing that she has been killed by the Atlanteans/Amazons war. It is revealed that Isis was held captive by the Outsider for Black Adam into selling the Outsider his home country, Khandaq. The Outsider then shot Black Adam and threw him off of his train, joining Isis as his trophy/prisoner.

In other media
Television
 The superhero Isis appears in The Freedom Force, voiced by Diane Pershing. This version is a member of the titular team.
 Two variations of Isis appear in a self-titled episode of Smallville. The first is Lois Lane (portrayed by Erica Durance) after she is possessed by the Amulet of Isis. Additionally, Egyptologist and curator of the Metropolis Museum, "Adrianna", appears in the episode, portrayed by Erica Cerra.
 The goddess Isis appears in Young Justice.
 A variation of Adrianna Tomaz named Zari Tomaz''' appears in Legends of Tomorrow, portrayed by Tala Ashe. This version is a Muslim-American hacker from the year 2042 who possesses aerokinesis via the Air Totem. In one Halloween-themed episode, Zari dons a costume based upon the one worn by Joanna Cameron's Isis. In the course of the series, a version of Zari from an alternate timeline (named Zari Tarazi and still played by Ashe) begins sharing Tomaz's existence and totem. The totem and its powers are also shared with Tarazi's brother from the altered timeline, Behrad Tarazi (played by Shayan Sobhian).

Film
Adrianna Tomaz appears in Black Adam, portrayed by Sarah Shahi. This version is an archaeologist and resistance fighter in Intergang-controlled Kahndaq.

Video games
 Isis appears in DC Universe Online voiced by Samantha Inoue-Harte. This version died sometime prior to the game before Felix Faust resurrects her as a zombie.
 Isis appears in Black Adam's ending for Injustice: Gods Among Us.
 Isis appears in Black Adam's ending for Injustice 2''.

References

1976 comics debuts
Comics characters introduced in 1975
Comics characters introduced in 1976
Comics characters introduced in 2006
Characters created by Geoff Johns
Characters created by Grant Morrison
Characters created by Greg Rucka
Characters created by Mark Waid
Comics about women
DC Comics characters who are shapeshifters
DC Comics characters who can move at superhuman speeds
DC Comics characters who use magic
DC Comics characters with superhuman strength
DC Comics deities
DC Comics female superheroes
DC Comics female supervillains
DC Comics metahumans
DC Comics telekinetics 
Captain Marvel (DC Comics)
Fictional characters who can manipulate time
Fictional characters with air or wind abilities
Fictional characters with earth or stone abilities
Fictional characters with electric or magnetic abilities
Fictional characters with elemental and environmental abilities
Fictional characters with fire or heat abilities
Fictional characters with healing abilities
Fictional characters with plant abilities
Fictional characters with precognition
Fictional characters with superhuman durability or invulnerability
Fictional characters with water abilities
Fictional characters with weather abilities
Fictional empaths
Fictional goddesses
Egyptian mythology in comics
Egyptian superheroes
Black Adam
Cultural depictions of Hatshepsut
Marvel Family